The 2022 Esiliiga B is the 10th season of the Esiliiga B, the third tier of Estonian football. The season began on 3 March 2022 and concluded on 13 November 2022.

Teams

Stadiums and locations

Personnel and kits

League table

Results

Matches 1–18

Matches 19–36

Relegation play-offs

Legion U21 won 5–1 on aggregate.

Season statistics

Top scorers

Hat-tricks 

Notes
4 Player scored 4 goals(H) – Home team(A) – Away team

Awards

Monthly awards

Esiliiga B Player of the Season
Tristan Pajo was named Esiliiga B Player of the Year.

References

External links
Official website

Esiliiga B seasons
3
Estonia
Estonia